The following lists events that happened during 2013 in Venezuela.

Incumbents
President: 
 until March 5: Hugo Chavez 
 March 5-April 19: Nicolás Maduro (interim)
 starting April 19: Nicolás Maduro
Vice President: 
 until March 5: Nicolás Maduro
 March 5-April 19: vacant
 starting April 19: Jorge Arreaza

Governors
Amazonas: Liborio Guarulla 
Anzoátegui: Aristóbulo Istúriz
Apure: Ramón Carrizales
Aragua: Tareck El Aissami 
Barinas: Adán Chávez 
Bolívar: Francisco Rangel Gómez
Carabobo: Francisco Ameliach  
Cojedes: Erika Farías 
Delta Amacuro: Lizeta Hernández
Falcón: Stella Lugo 
Guárico: Ramón Rodríguez Chacín
Lara: Henri Falcón 
Mérida: Alexis Ramirez 
Miranda: Henrique Capriles Radonski 
Monagas: Yelitza Santaella
Nueva Esparta: Carlos Mata Figueroa 
Portuguesa: Wilmar Castro 
Sucre: Luis Acuña 
Táchira: José Vielma Mora 
Trujillo: Henry Rangel Silva
Vargas: Jorge García Carneiro
Yaracuy: Julio León Heredia
Zulia: Francisco Arias Cárdenas

Events

January

February
 February 7 - Increase the value of the Tax Unit 107 bolivars.

March
 March 5 — Venezuelan President Hugo Chávez dies aged 58, in the Military Hospital.

April
 April 14 – interim president Nicolás Maduro wins presidential election.

Deaths
May 23 - Luis Zuloaga, 90, baseball player

References

 
Years of the 21st century in Venezuela
Venezuela
Venezuela
2010s in Venezuela